Bank of the Cascades is the principal subsidiary of Cascade Bancorp (NASDAQ: CACB). Headquartered in Bend, Oregon, it was founded in 1977. They are a sponsor of the Bank of The Cascades Center, a 4,000-seat arena in Redmond, Oregon. The company announced in 2016 it would be acquired by First Interstate BancSystem of Montana for $589 million. The acquisition was completed May 30, 2017.

References

Banks based in Oregon
Companies based in Bend, Oregon
Banks established in 1977
1977 establishments in Oregon
Companies formerly listed on the Nasdaq
Defunct banks of the United States